The FIAT APR.2 was a prototype airliner built in Italy in 1935. It was a sleek, low-wing cantilever monoplane of conventional configuration with tailwheel undercarriage, the main units of which retracted into the engine nacelles, one on each wing. The cabin could carry 12 passengers, and at the time of its introduction on Ala Littoria's Milan-Turin-Paris route, it was believed to be the fastest airliner in regular service in the world. Despite this, only one example was built, although the design served as a starting point for the Fiat BR.20 bomber.

Specifications

See also

References

 
 
 luftfahrt-archiv.de

APR.2
1930s Italian airliners
Low-wing aircraft
Aircraft first flown in 1935
Twin piston-engined tractor aircraft